Debra Williams may refer to:

 Debra Marshall (born 1960), formerly Williams, American actress and wrestler
 Debra Williams (basketball) (born 1972), basketball player